Isma'il Ahmad Adham (  Ismā'īl Aḥmad Adham; 1911 – July 1940) was an Egyptian writer and literary critic who was born in the Ottoman Empire and lived in Alexandria. He claimed to have been educated in Russia and to have received his PhD in Mathematics from the University of Moscow in 1931. Adham wrote reviews of the poetry of Egypt's most celebrated writers of the era, such as Khalil Mutran, and worked as an editor for the poet and publisher Ahmed Zaki Abu Shadi. He was one of the few writers of Egypt's old regime to openly declare his atheism, which he attempted to promote through his infamous manifesto Why am I an Atheist?. This essay provoked heated responses from theist writers of the period, putting Adham in the limelight.

Adham apparently suffered from depression, and fed his melancholy by reading Schopenhauer and Kierkegaard. Adham drowned at the age of 29 in the Mediterranean Sea in July 1940. His cadaver was found floating, a suicide note addressed to the police in his pocket. In the note, Adham explained that he committed suicide because he hated life, and he asked that his body be cremated instead of buried.

References

External links
  "Blasted Backlash," by Gamal Nkrumah. Al-Ahram Weekly, 3–9 April 2008, Issue No. 891
  "Islamic viewpoints: New secularism in the Arab world," by Ghassan F. Abdullah. Center for Inquiry.

1911 births
1940 deaths
Emigrants from the Ottoman Empire to Egypt
20th-century Egyptian writers
Egyptian atheists
Former Muslims turned agnostics or atheists
Suicides by drowning
1940 suicides
Egyptian male writers